Tin Sam Village or Tin Sam Tsuen, sometimes transliterated as Tin Sum, is a village in Tai Wai, Sha Tin District, Hong Kong. It is located west of Sun Chui Estate, north of Lung Hang Estate, and southeast of Festival City. Part of Tin Sam Village consists of Tin Sam Wai, a historic walled village.

Administration
Tin Sam is a recognized village under the New Territories Small House Policy. It is one of the villages represented within the Sha Tin Rural Committee. For electoral purposes, Tin Sam Tsuen is part of the Tin Sum constituency., which was formerly represented by Tsang Kit until July 2021.

History
Tin Sam was founded in the late Ming Dynasty (1368-1644). It was a Punti walled village, historically inhabited by the Choi, the Wai, the Leung, the Tsang and the Liu. A moat was built for its protection, and was later filled up and used as a fish pond.

The Che Kung Temple in Tai Wai was built and initially managed by Tin Sam Village. The village lost its managerial rights in the late 19th century in a lawsuit against the Kau Yeuk ("Alliance of Nine" [villages]), a regional organization of various groups in Sha Tin Valley, that was settled in a lawsuit at the yamen. The Kau Yeuk had provided evidence that it made significant contributions to the renovation of the temple. The Kau Yeuk could prove its case by referring to the rhymed couplets that were inscribed on both sides of the main entrance and that bore its name. The temple was subsequently jointly managed by nine villages of Sha Tin, while Tin Sam Village continued to enjoy some privileges in the worship of Che Kung. Since 1936, the temple has been administered by the Chinese Temples Committee.

Features
Historic buildings in the village include the Choi Ancestral Hall, also known as Chung Kwong Family Hall, built around the 1920s, the Leung Ancestral Halls, two ancestral houses, largely rebuilt and occupied by tenants, the Liu Ancestral Hall, and the Entrance Gate, built during the Qing Dynasty. Two rectangular holes are above the front doorways of the Gate for feng shui benefit and for security watching.

Festival
The Da Jiu Festival of the village is organized every 10 years. It was celebrated in December 2006 and in 2016.

See also
 Tai Wai for a detailed list of the other villages in the area
 San Tin Village
 Walled villages of Hong Kong
 List of villages in Hong Kong

References

Further reading

External links

 Delineation of area of existing village Tin Sum (Sha Tin) for election of resident representative (2019 to 2022)
 Antiquities Advisory Board. Pictures of Tin Sam Wai entrance gate
 Antiquities Advisory Board. Pictures of Choi Ancestral Hall

Tai Wai
Walled villages of Hong Kong
Villages in Sha Tin District, Hong Kong